Virginia is an unincorporated community in Bannock County, Idaho. It is located at the junction of Interstate 15 and U.S. Route 91 south of Arimo. It shares its zip code, 83234, with Downey.

References

Pocatello, Idaho metropolitan area
Unincorporated communities in Bannock County, Idaho